Gregory Murphy (born 23 August 1972) is a New Zealand professional racing driver, best known as a four-time winner of the Bathurst 1000. Greg Murphy joined Jeremy Clarkson and James May presenting Top Gear Live, when it had its first international Live show at ASB Showgrounds in Auckland from 12 to 15 February 2009, and again when the show returned in 2010.

History

Murphy became involved in motorsports by the age of eight, progressing through karts to saloon cars and single-seaters before moving to Australia. He first competed at the Bathurst circuit in 1994. The following two years he drove for Brad Jones Racing in the Australian Super Touring Championship and the Holden Racing Team (HRT) in endurance events, winning the Bathurst 1000 with Craig Lowndes in 1996. He drove for the HRT full-time in the 1997 Australian Touring Car Championship and placed fourth. Due to Craig Lowndes' return from overseas, Murphy only drove for the team in the endurance races in 1998.

In 1999 and 2000, he finished 6th in points driving for Gibson Motorsport. He paired with Steven Richards to win the Bathurst 1000. In the 2001 V8 Supercar season, Murphy joined the newly formed K-Mart Racing team and had two Bathurst 1000 wins with teammate Rick Kelly, in 2003 and 2004. Murphy had two championship runners-up while at K-Mart Racing, in 2002 and 2003. In 2001 and 2004 he finished fourth in the championship.

He is one of the best known V8 Supercar drivers (car No. 51 since 2001) and has won four rounds at his home circuit at Pukekohe, near Auckland (2001, 2002, 2003 and 2005). At the Mount Panorama Circuit at Bathurst, Murphy has the third best record for a Kiwi with four wins, compared to Jim Richards' seven, and his son Steven Richards' five.

Murphy's 2003 pole position of 2:06.8594 at Bathurst stood as the fastest lap ever recorded at Mount Panorama Circuit until eclipsed seven years later. It is known colloquially as "The Lap of the Gods" and widely regarded as one of the finest moments in Bathurst folklore.

In November of 2003, Murphy won the Bathurst 24 Hour race in the Garry Rogers Motorsport built, 7.0 litre V8 Holden Monaro 427C alongside Peter Brock, Jason Bright and Todd Kelly. Murphy qualified the #05 Monaro in second place behind the 2002 race winning Monaro of teammate Garth Tander. The two Monaro's led the race throughout with Murphy in the car finishing only 0.3505 in front of Tander after 527 laps of racing.

During 2005 and 2006 Murph competed for Paul Weel Racing (PWR) where he initially had good results until changing to the Perkins engines. Since then Murphy has never really had any outstanding performances.
Murphy joined Tasman Motorsport in 2007 where his lack of results continued.

Murphy joined Paul Morris Motorsport in 2010 to drive Castrol supported Commodore. While the partnership looked like it was to reignite the "old murph" his performances and a poor car failed to produce results thus the announcement came in November 2010 that the partnership would split.

Murphy joined Kelly Racing for 2011 in a late deal with major sponsor Pepsi Max. Throughout the year the Pepsi Max Crew car has undergone four different paint schemes all with a graffiti theme. Murphy has had varying success throughout the year and as he has become more comfortable with his car and the team he has had some good performances, including pole position at the Bathurst 1000.

2013 saw Murphy return to Holden Racing Team on a part-time basis, co-driving with Car #22 driver James Courtney in the endurance events. However, Bathurst saw Murphy involved in a heavy crash at Reid Park, therefore ending his chances of finishing the race. The bad luck didn't end there, with yet another serious incident bringing Car #22 down (this time involving Paul Dumbrell from Triple Eight Race Engineering) in Race 1 at Gold Coast.

In 2021 Peter Adderton from Boost Mobile floated the idea of running a Wildcard entry for Murphy and fellow retired Kiwi racer Richie Stanaway in the upcoming Bathurst 1000. The idea gained massive fan support, helping to convince Murphy and Stanaway to return for the first time since 2014 & 2019 respectively. On 8 June 2021 it was confirmed that the two would return in an Erebus Motorsport run Boost Mobile supported entry. On 12 November 2021 the wildcard was postponed due to travel restrictions between Australia & New Zealand. In late April 2022 Erebus Motorsport confirmed that the Wildcard would be revived for the upcoming Bathurst 1000. There were plans to run Murphy & Stanaway in solo events prior to Bathurst but those plans fell through, the two will get three test days prior to the 1000 with the first set to be run at Winton Motor Raceway on 7 June.

Notable career events

1994 – Won the New Zealand Grand Prix at Manfeild driving a Reynard 90D
1996 – Second in the GT2 Class at Le Mans
1996 – Won Bathurst 1000 and Sandown 500 with Craig Lowndes and the Holden Racing Team
1999 – Won the Bathurst 1000 with Steven Richards
2000 – Third at Bathurst with Steven Richards
2001 – Helped to create Kmart Racing after Gibson Motorsport turned to Ford and Craig Lowndes. Finished third at Bathurst with Todd Kelly
2002 – Was given the biggest penalty (five minutes) in V8 racing history because of a pitlane infringement by his team. His car was released early, rupturing a refuelling hose and spilling fuel in the pit box
2003 – Set the fastest lap ever on the 6.213 km (later eclipsed in 2010 by Craig Lowndes and then again in 2017 by Scott McLaughlin) Mount Panorama Circuit during the Top 10 Shootout, with a time of 2:06.8594 dubbed 'The Lap of Gods'. Won Bathurst 1000 with Rick Kelly. Won Bathurst 24 Hour with Peter Brock, Todd Kelly and Jason Bright
2004 – Won Bathurst 1000 again with Rick Kelly
2008 – Finished second at Bathurst 1000
2011 – Got pole position for the second time at Bathurst and finished 3rd in the 2011 Bathurst 1000
2012 – Won the first ever V8SuperTourer race at Hampton Downs, then eventually finished Runner-up for the Season.
2013 – Greg Murphy Won the V8SuperTourer Sprint Series and Overall Championship, his first Championship Win in 17 years.
2014 – Murphy Won the V8SuperTourer Sprint Series and Overall Championship for the second year in a row. Greg also finished second in the Sandown 500 with James Courtney.
2016 – Murphy returned to circuit racing for the first time since the Gold Coast 600 in 2014. He joined Tony Quinn in an Aston Martin for the Highlands 101 race where they finished second place.

Personal life
Greg was born and raised in New Zealand, where he attended Havelock North High School. After being based in Melbourne, Victoria for most of his racing career he now lives in New Zealand with frequent trips to Australia.

Career results

Career Highlights

Complete V8 Supercar results

Bathurst 1000 results

* Super Touring race

Complete American Le Mans Series results
(key) (Races in bold indicate pole position) (Races in italics indicate fastest lap)

Complete 24 Hours of Le Mans results

Complete Bathurst 24 Hour results

V8SuperTourer
In 2011 it was released that in New Zealand they were making a new touring car series, Murphy was instantly interested and after talks with Paul Manuell they decided to make M3 Racing which Richard Moore, Paul Manuell and Greg Murphy would drive their three cars. As soon as Murphy confirmed he would be racing in the 2012 season, New Zealand Businessman Mike Pero signed up to be his major sponsor for the season.

In the 2012 season Murphy had a successful year claiming a pole, 5 race wins and 2 round wins and also the Endurance Championship but because he had to miss two rounds because of back problems he missed out on the overall championship but managed to finish 2nd overall.

The 2013 season Murphy redeemed himself after missing out on the title due to back problems, Murphy managed to win 6 races and finished on the podium 14 times out of 21 races, and after a thrilling final race battle with Ant Pedersen, Murphy won his first SuperTourer title.

Complete V8 SuperTourer results

TCR New Zealand

References

External links

Profile at V8 Supercars
Video of Greg Murphy's "Lap of the Gods" at Bathurst
Greg Murphy at Pepsi Max Crew, Kelly Racing 

New Zealand racing drivers
Supercars Championship drivers
1972 births
Living people
Sportspeople from Hastings, New Zealand
Bathurst 1000 winners
24 Hours of Le Mans drivers
Australian Touring Car Championship drivers
Formula Holden drivers
V8SuperTourer drivers
Toyota Racing Series drivers
American Le Mans Series drivers
Australian Endurance Championship drivers
Kelly Racing drivers
Audi Sport drivers
Garry Rogers Motorsport drivers